The 1931–32 Yugoslav Football Championship (Serbo-Croato-Slovenian: Državno prvenstvo 1931/32 / Државно првенство 1931/32) was the 10th season of Kingdom of Yugoslavia's premier football competition.

A surprising revert to the cup system, presumably to test out how a double-match cup will work (as the previous cups have been single game eliminations).

Bracket

Winning squad
Champions:

Concordia Zagreb (coach: Bogdan Cuvaj)

Sergije Demić 
Pavičić 
Ivan Belošević 
Boško Ralić
Đuka Agić
Pavao Löw
Egidio Martinović
Nikola Babić
Svetislav Valjarević
Slavko Kodrnja
Zvonko Jazbec
Lolić

Top scorers
Final goalscoring position, number of goals, player/players and club.
1 - 10 goals - Svetislav Valjarević (Concordia)
2 - 4 goals - Nikola Babić (Concordia), Leo Lemešić (Hajduk Split)

References

External links
Yugoslavia Domestic Football Full Tables

Yugoslav Football Championship
Yugo
1931–32 in Yugoslav football